Lakeside Country Club may refer to:

 A country club that is part of the Lakeside Leisure Complex in Frimley Green
 A country club in Toluca Lake, Los Angeles

See also 
 Lakeside (disambiguation)
 Lakeside Golf Course (disambiguation)